Ebba Tesdorpf (23 January 1851 – 22 February 1920) was an illustrator and watercolorist from Hamburg, Germany.

Life 

Tesdorpf came from a Hanseatic family.  She was the daughter of businessman Hans Peter Friedrich Tesdorpf and Antoinette Karoline Mohrmann (formerly Abendroth).  Her ancestors include her great-grandfather Peter Hinrich Tesdorpf (1751-1832) and his great-grandfather, Peter Hinrich Tesdorpf (1648-1723), both mayors of Lübeck.

She developed her talent for drawing in Hamburg. For a short time in 1898 she trained under Hermann Gross at the Academy in Düsseldorf. Her teachers were Mohrhagen Bernhard and Johann Theobald Riefesell who primarily taught drawing to women of the Hamburg high society.

At the suggestion of Justus Brinckmann and Alfred Lichtwark, Tesdorpf drew a documentation of the old Hamburg cityscape during the demolition phase in the 1880s and 1890s. Recording Hamburg became a passion for Ebba Tesdorpf. In her paintings she captured everything from the mundane scenes of Hamburg, its streets, the old parts of the town and the new, the city harbor and the canals that ran through it.  With the death of her parents Tesdorpf became financially independent. Around 1894 Tesdorpf grew tired of life in Hamburg and moved to Düsseldorf, where she lived from then on. She donated her drawings as well as her purchased collection of valuable Hamburgensien (works of art pertaining to Hamburg) to the Hamburg Museum of Arts and Crafts. These pieces were later moved to the Museum of Hamburg History and provide a unique documentary of the appearance of the city of Hamburg in the second half of the 19th century. Tesdorpf considered it her "mission" to capture the "old Hamburg" in images - often structures destined for demolition in the years of urban renewal.

Her life's work included over 600 drawings, along with a few watercolors which she painted at the turn of the century. In Düsseldorf she mainly painted oil paintings.  Tesdorpf died during a stay at a spa in Ahrweiler.

References

Further reading 

 Gisela Jaacks: Mit Ebba Tesdorpf durch Alt-Hamburg, Hamburg 1978
 Deutsches Geschlechterbuch, Volume 171 (Hamburgisches Geschlechterbuch, Volume 12), Limburg an der Lahn 1975, pp. 533–558
 Hans-Günther Freitag: Von Mönckeberg bis Hagenbeck, ein Wegweiser zu denkwürdigen Grabstätten auf dem Friedhof Ohlsdorf, 2 editions, Hamburg 1973, p. 24

External links 

 Works by Ebba Tesdorpf at Zeno.org 
 Literature by and about Ebba Tesdorpf at the German National Library

German illustrators
German watercolourists
19th-century German artists
Artists from Hamburg
20th-century German artists
1851 births
1920 deaths
19th-century German painters
20th-century German painters
German women painters
19th-century German women artists
20th-century German women artists
Women watercolorists